The 2021–22 season is the 64th season in the existence of FC Slovan Liberec and the club's 29th consecutive season in the top flight of Czech football. In addition to the domestic league, Slovan Liberec will participate in this season's edition of the Czech Cup.

Players

First-team squad

Transfers

Pre-season and friendlies

Competitions

Overall record

Czech First League

League table

Results summary

Results by round

Matches

Czech Cup

References

FC Slovan Liberec seasons
Slovan Liberec